The Chamalières tablet (French: Plomb de Chamalières) is a lead tablet, six by four centimeters, that was discovered in 1971 in Chamalières, France, at the Source des Roches excavation. The tablet is dated somewhere between 50 BC and 50 AD. The text is written in the Gaulish language, with cursive Latin letters. With 396 letters grouped in 47 words, it is the third-longest extant text in Gaulish (the curse tablet from L'Hospitalet-du-Larzac and the Coligny calendar being longer), giving it great importance in the study of this language. The magical subject matter of the text, which invokes the Celtic deity Maponos, suggests it should be considered a defixiones tablet.

Pierre-Yves Lambert, in his book La langue gauloise, offers an analysis.

Text 
andedion uediIumi diIiuion risun
artiu mapon aruerriIatin
lopites snIeððdic sos brixtia anderon
clucionfloronnigrinon adgarionaemilI
on paterin claudIon legitumon caelion
pelign claudío pelign marcion uictorin asiatI
con aððedillI etic secoui toncnaman
toncsiIontío meIon toncsesit bue
tid ollon reguccambion exsops
pissIiumItsoccaantI rissuis onson
bissIet lugedessummiIis luge
dessumíis lugedessumIIs luxe

In popular culture
The Swiss folk metal band Eluveitie used the text for their song Dessumiis Luge, and the first two verses for Spirit.

See also
Larzac tablet

References

Xavier Delamarre, Dictionnaire de la langue gauloise, Paris, Errance, 2003.
Pierre-Yves Lambert, La langue gauloise, Paris, Errance, 2003.
Venceslas Kruta, Les Celtes. Histoire et dictionnaire, Paris, Laffont, 2000.
Études celtiques, XV-1, 1977, pp. 156 sv.

External links
Article sur le site persee.fr.
L'arbre celtique.

Iron Age France
Gaulish inscriptions
Curse tablets
Archaeology of Auvergne